Brodarevo is a village located in the municipality of Prijepolje, southwestern Serbia. According to the 2011 census, the village has a population of 1,845 inhabitants. A border crossing between Serbia and Montenegro is located in the village.

References

Populated places in Zlatibor District